Hovet is the self-titled debut album from Lars Winnerbäck's backup band Hovet. The album was recorded while Winnerbäck was focusing on his acoustic album Vatten under broarna.

Track listing
"Bästa orkestern" (Lyrics: Andersson; Arrangements: Hovet)
"Rester" (Lyrics and arrangements: Persson, Schultz, Back, Zackrisson)
"Hawaii Persson" (Lyrics and arrangements: Eriksson, Back)
"Silverfisken" (Lyrics and arrangements: Eriksson, Andersson, Zackrisson)
"Våra hjärtan" (Lyrics and arrangements: Zackrisson, Persson, Stadling)
"Svarta segel" (Lyrics and arrangements: Persson, Stadling, Back, Zackrisson)
"Vi gillar varann" (Lyrics and arrangements: Eriksson, Andersson)
"Julia" (Lyrics and arrangements: Zackrisson, Persson)
"Odenplan 1 min" (Lyrics and arrangements: Eriksson)
"Brinner" (Lyrics and arrangements: Stadling, Schultz, Persson)
"Bandet" (Lyrics and arrangements: Back)
"Vacker & lugn" (Lyrics and arrangements: Atadling, Back)
"2:a Advent" (Lyrics and arrangements: Zackrisson, Back, Andersson, Eriksson)

External links
Official Website

2004 albums